Gilt-bronze Maitreya in Meditation may refer to:

 Gilt-bronze Maitreya in Meditation (National Treasure No. 78), a Korean Buddhist sculpture
 Gilt-bronze Maitreya in Meditation (National Treasure No. 83), a Korean Buddhist sculpture